Salatiwara was a city of Bronze Age Anatolia. It was besieged by Anitta in the 18th century BC with 1400 infantry and 40 chariots (http://titus.uni-frankfurt.de/didact/idg/anat/hethbs.htm).

Hittite cities
Former populated places in Turkey
Lost ancient cities and towns